"One More Day" is a song written by Bobby Tomberlin and Steven Dale Jones, and recorded by American country music group Diamond Rio. It was released in October 2000 as the second single and title track from their album One More Day, in addition to gaining popularity after the death of NASCAR driver Dale Earnhardt. The song reached the top of the Billboard Hot Country Singles & Tracks (now Hot Country Songs) chart. It peaked at number 29 on the Billboard Hot 100, making it a minor crossover hit. After falling from the charts, it received heavy recurrent rotation as a tribute to the people who died in the September 11, 2001 terrorist attacks.

Content

The narrator has a dream that a wish was granted to him. He talks about how he didn't wish for any extravagant gift like a "mansion in Malibu", he wished for one more day with his lover.

Reception

Keyboardist Dan Truman recalled the beginning of the songs popularity, “It all started in Los Angeles, when RCA Nashville chairman Joe Galante played six of our new songs for some RCA people who were from outside country music. When he came home, he told us he was just astounded, because after he played ‘One More Day’ everybody stood up and applauded. That’s why it was chosen for a single. And then, there it went.”

Music video

The music video was shot in black and white and directed by Deaton Flanigen and features Diamond Rio performing in and outside of a mansion. It also shows a model swimming in the mansion's swimming pool. The video premiered on September 28, 2000 on CMT.

Chart performance
The song entered the Hot Country Singles & Tracks chart at number 68 on November 4, 2000, and spent a total of 33 weeks on that chart.

"One More Day" reached the #1 position on the Billboard country chart dated for March 10, 2001, making it the group's third number one overall and their first since "How Your Love Makes Me Feel" in 1997. A week later, it fell to #2, with Toby Keith's "You Shouldn't Kiss Me Like This" — which had also been #1 on the March 3 survey — reclaiming the #1 spot. Keith also held the top spot on March 24, with Diamond Rio still at #2 that week. Finally, on the chart dated March 31, "One More Day" returned to the #1 position, giving the song a total of two non-consecutive weeks at the top of the country chart.

In addition to peaking at number 6 on the Adult Contemporary charts, "One More Day" peaked at number 29 on the Billboard Hot 100.

Charts

Weekly charts

Year-end charts

References

2000 singles
2000 songs
Diamond Rio songs
Songs written by Steven Dale Jones
Music videos directed by Deaton-Flanigen Productions
Arista Nashville singles
Country ballads
Black-and-white music videos